Harrison "Wawa" Chongo (5 June 1969 – 12 May 2011) was a Zambia international football player who played in central defence or as a defensive midfielder.

Career
Born in Lusaka, Chongo began playing club football Mufulira Wanderers F.C., breaking into the first team in 1989. In 1992, he joined Al Taawon Club in the Saudi First Division, where he played until he retired.

Chongo was included in the Zambia national football team that reached the final for the 1994 African Nations Cup. He also played in 11 FIFA World Cup qualifying matches. and wawa is regarded as the first Zambian footballer ever to have played professional football for Arabs for a decade in Saudi Arabia and once attended trials for 2 English premier league side Crystal Palace and Barnsley FC after assisting his Saudi-based club Al-Tawoon for winning promotion to Saudi professional league this time as champions for the first time ever in 1996/97 season, he impressed during the trials in England in 1997 despite being overpriced as their defense kingpin and the deal fell through. Nevertheless, he achieved so much and made a second coming for his childhood team Mufulira Wanderers to wrap up his playing career in 2002 as coach player and became appointed as interim coach in 2010 and helped the team survive relegation from sinking into division 2. At the start of the 2011 season he was given a go-ahead as a head coach for the first time and managed to run the 8-game unbeaten race despite death cutting short his dream for bouncing "mighty" to the super league.

Personal
He died in May 2011 of malaria. At the time of his death he was head coach of Mufulira Wanderers.

References

External links

1969 births
2011 deaths
Sportspeople from Lusaka
Zambian footballers
Zambia international footballers
Zambian expatriate footballers
Expatriate footballers in Saudi Arabia
Zambian expatriate sportspeople in Saudi Arabia
1992 African Cup of Nations players
1994 African Cup of Nations players
1996 African Cup of Nations players
1998 African Cup of Nations players
Zambian football managers
Al-Taawoun FC players
Saudi First Division League players
Saudi Professional League players
Association football defenders